Ram Hari Subedi is a member of the 2nd Nepalese Constituent Assembly. He won the Kavre–2 seat at the CA assembly, 2013 from the Communist Party of Nepal (Unified Marxist–Leninist).

References

Communist Party of Nepal (Unified Marxist–Leninist) politicians
Living people
Year of birth missing (living people)
Khas people
Members of the 2nd Nepalese Constituent Assembly